MacDonnell Heights is a census-designated place (CDP) in the town of Poughkeepsie in Dutchess County, New York, United States. It was first listed as a CDP prior to the 2020 census.

The community is in western Dutchess County, in the northeastern section of the town of Poughkeepsie. It is bordered to the southeast by Wappinger Creek, across which is the town of LaGrange. The CDP includes the hamlets of MacDonnell Heights and Colonial Heights. U.S. Route 44 (Dutchess Turnpike) passes through the center of the CDP, leading west  to the center of Poughkeepsie and northeast  to Amenia.

Demographics

References 

Census-designated places in Dutchess County, New York
Census-designated places in New York (state)